The 42d Mississippi Infantry Regiment (also known as the "Forty-second Mississippi") was an infantry formation of the Confederate States Army in the Eastern Theater of the American Civil War, and was successively commanded by Colonels Hugh R. Miller, William A. Feeney, and Andrew M. Nelson.

History
The Forty-second was organized on May 14, 1862, in the Mississippi Volunteers at Oxford from the counties of Carroll, DeSoto, Tishomingo, Calhoun, Yalobusha, Panola, and Itawamba. For a time, it served on provost duty in Richmond, Virginia, then was assigned to Davis' Brigade, Heth's Division, Third Corps, Army of Northern Virginia. It was active from Gettysburg to Cold Harbor, endured the hardships of the Petersburg siege south of the James River, and saw action around Appomattox. It lost 46 percent of the 575 engaged at Gettysburg, had eight disabled en route from Pennsylvania, and had six killed and 25 wounded during the Bristoe Campaign. The regiment surrendered one lieutenant, one chaplain, and five enlisted men on April 9, 1865.

Regimental order of battle
Units of the Forty-second Mississippi included:

 Company A (Carroll Fencibles)
 Company B (Senatobia Invincibles)
 Company C (Nelson's Avengers)
 Company D
 Company E (Davenport Rifles)
 Company F 
 Company G (Gaston Rifles)
 Company H
 Company I (Mississippi Reds)
 Company K

See also
 List of Mississippi Civil War Confederate units

Notes

References

Further reading

 
 
 
 
 
 
 
 
 
 
 
 

1862 establishments in Mississippi
1865 disestablishments in Virginia
Military units and formations established in 1862
Military units and formations disestablished in 1865
Units and formations of the Confederate States Army from Mississippi